John Ross (1744 – 1809) was a British Army officer in the French and Indian War and the American Revolution.  He is best known for commanding a mixed force of approximately 600 (some sources say 1750) regulars, Loyalists, and Indians in a raid into upstate New York on October 24, 1781 that culminated in the Battle of Johnstown, one of the last battles in the northern theater of the American Revolution. After the war, Ross was instrumental in settling Loyalist refugees in what is now the Kingston area of eastern Ontario.

Early career and the French and Indian War

Ross was born in Scotland in 1744. He was commissioned lieutenant in the 34th Regiment of Foot in July, 1762, and was present for the capture of Havana that year and then went on to garrison West Florida.  In 1764, following the conclusion of the French and Indian War he was sent to the Illinois Country as an emissary to the French Commander at Fort de Chartres. On this trip he mapped the Mississippi Valley from New Orleans to de Chartres. He was promoted to captain in March, 1772.

American Revolutionary War

In 1780 Ross was given the temporary rank of major to organize the second battalion of the King's Royal Regiment of New York (Royal Yorkers) at Lachine, Quebec. Later that year the second battalion was sent to occupy and fortify Carleton Island in New York's Thousand Islands.

In October 1781 Ross led a force of troops from his garrison and from Fort Niagara in a raid on the Mohawk Valley by way of Oswego and Oneida Lake. The American forces repelled the British; during the retreat the famed commander of Butler's Rangers, Walter Butler, was killed.  On his return to Carleton Island Ross  built Fort Haldimand. In 1782 he led a force which occupied Oswego and rebuilt Fort Ontario.

Cataraqui settlement

In 1783 Ross, was assigned to Cataraqui, now Kingston, Ontario to arrange the resettlement of Loyalist refugees in the Cataraqui area. To help with this assignment Ross brought with him 25 officers and 422 men, most of whom belonged to the Royal Yorkers. He rebuilt and repaired the old French fort (Fort Frontenac) to enable the establishment of a garrison, built grist and saw mills, established a navy yard, and assisted with the allotment of land and supplies. Ross also recommended that the land on which the Loyalists were settling should be purchased from the Mississaugas.

Since local concerns were administered by the military, Ross was appointed Justice of the Peace in 1784 to better enable him to deal with civilian problems among the settlers. Because of Ross's significance in establishing the Cataraqui settlement, It has been said that "He, rather than Michael Grass ... should be called the 'founder of Kingston.'"

Later years

It is believed he married a sister of Captain John McDonell of Butler’s Rangers.

In 1785 Ross returned to England to care for his aged father. He was promoted major in the 34th Foot on May 20, 1785. He returned to Canada in 1786 and was arrested based on accusations by his second in command at Cataraqui. Ross was exonerated and put in command of the 34th Foot in Montreal in August, 1786. The regiment returned to England in 1787.

Ross retired from the army in 1789 and sold his commission.
He re-entered service during the Napoleonic wars and at some point was promoted to lieutenant-colonel. Ross transferred to the Coldstream Guards and was killed at the Battle of Talavera in Spain in July 1809 during the Peninsular War.

References
Notes

Bibliography

 Mika, Nick and Helma et al. Kingston, Historic City. Belleville: Mika Publishing Co., 1987. .
 Osborne, Brian S. and Donald Swainson. Kingston, Building on the Past for the Future. Quarry Heritage Books, 2011. 
 

British Army personnel of the American Revolutionary War
1744 births
1809 deaths
British Army personnel of the Peninsular War
British military personnel killed in action in the Napoleonic Wars
British Army personnel of the French and Indian War
Coldstream Guards officers